The Maniguin Island Lighthouse is a lighthouse that marks the Cuyo East Passage, a main shipping route south into the Sulu Sea. The island, also known as Maningning Island or Hammerhead Island, is located 42.6 km (26.5 miles) off of the coast of Culasi, Antique in the Philippines.  It has a narrow ridge 33.5 metres (110 feet) high across its southern end, and the remainder of the island is low and wooded, and not more than 4.5 metres (15 feet) high. It is fringed with coral reefs with deep water at their edges.  The round cylindrical concrete tower with a gallery on top is located near the southeastern point of the island.

History

The Spanish plan for the station 
The Spanish Government's plan of building a second-order lighthouse on Maniguin Island was part of the Maritime Lighting program of the Philippine Archipelago which was in full swing in the latter part of 19th century. The original design was a beautiful and massive masonry tower similar to the Cape Melville Lighthouse.

When the Americans took control of the Philippines after the Spanish–American War, the Spanish plans and records for all lighthouses were turned over to the United States. New, more economical plans were adopted to illuminate the islands as quickly as possible from the limited insular funds available, and the Spanish plans were scrapped.

Construction of the lighthouse 
In 1904, a preliminary examination was made of this island.  A map has been made and the elevation of the site of the proposed station obtained. A new plan for the various structures to be erected was prepared. For the first time, reinforced concrete will be used instead of masonry for a lighthouse tower in the Philippines. A budget of ₱60,000 was set for the construction.

A party of two Americans, one Spanish mason, and 40 Filipinos was organized in December 1904, and sent to this station, leaving Manila on December 29. On March 20, 1905, the party was increased to a total of 106 by the employment of local laborers. A dedicated sloop named Jervey was used in transporting laborers and water.

On April 1, 1905, a temporary fixed white light from a lens lantern was displayed from the highest point of Maniguin Island, at an elevation of 40 metres (130 feet) above mean high water. The light was visible all around the horizon, and in clear weather was visible at a distance of 21 km (13 miles).

Work on the tower was immediately begun after the construction of the temporary quarters. The dwellings and accessory buildings were also made with reinforced concrete. A contract had been let in Hong Kong for the iron stairs, which were delivered in August 1905.

On all previous stations, it has been necessary either to use materials purchased or plans prepared under the supervision of the Spanish Government. As this station was the first to be constructed throughout, construction was speedy and of a higher standard at a much lower cost. At the end of the 1905, the tower was constructed to the balcony, cistern built, foundation of dwelling finished, doors, windows, and louvres made.

Work was completed the following year and the fourth-order light was lit for the first time.

Current condition 
This American lighthouse was recently abandoned. The Philippine Coast Guard erected a new white tower powered by solar energy a short distance away from the original tower as a replacement.

See also 

 List of lighthouses in the Philippines

References

External links 
 Maritime Safety Services Command
 Image of the American-built Maniguin (Maningning) lighthouse and the white replacement tower.
 Lighthouse Depot: Maniguin Island Light

Lighthouses in the Philippines
Lighthouses completed in 1906
Buildings and structures in Antique (province)
Demolished buildings and structures in the Philippines
1906 establishments in the Philippines